Contain Us is an 8-disc box set released by Canadian musician Devin Townsend on December 9, 2011. It sums all the significant material Townsend has done during 2007–2011 under the Devin Townsend Project moniker. The idea of the box set was introduced by Townsend in 2009 when the first Devin Townsend Project album Ki was revealed.

Contents

The box set includes all four Devin Townsend Project albums (Deconstruction and Ghost are remastered for this release). Bonus disc section includes two CDs and two DVDs consisting of both released and unreleased material. All the discs are housed inside the covers of a 64-page hardcover book. The book itself contains liner notes, promotional material and photography taken during Devin Townsend Project studio and live situations. The book is housed in a charcoal linen hardcover slipcase. The box set is limited to 5,000 copies worldwide, and 500 copies are shipped with a printed drawing signed by Townsend and a limited 10" clear vinyl including two unreleased songs.

Track listing

CD 1: Ki

All songs written by Townsend except where noted.

CD 2: Addicted

All songs written by Townsend.

CD 3: Deconstruction

All songs written by Townsend.

CD 4: Ghost

All songs written by Townsend except where noted.

Bonus CD 1: Stuff That Was Almost Stuff

All songs written by Townsend.

Bonus CD 2: Stuff That Was Stuff Before It Was Finished Stuff

All songs written by Townsend.

Bonus DVD 1: Stuff for Your Eyes
Tuska Open Air Metal Festival, 2010 (Five songs)
NAMM 2011 show (Six songs)
"Coast" promo video
"Bend It Like Bender!" promo video
"Supercrush!" promo video
"Juular" promo video

Bonus DVD 2: Stuff for the Holes in Your Head (Except Your Mouth)
Data disc with both audio and video files.
NAMM 2011 show (Audio file, six songs)
Audio commentary for all four Devin Townsend Project albums
Live in the USA, 2010 (Audio files, five songs)
Make Your Own Mixes! ("Juular" and "Bend It Like Bender!" song stems as audio files for remixing)
Devin Townsend's YouTube videos
Deep Thoughts videos

Bonus vinyl
Special 10" clear vinyl limited to 500 hand-numbered copies.

References

Devin Townsend albums
2011 compilation albums
Inside Out Music compilation albums
Albums produced by Devin Townsend